Indira Indu was a Hindi poet from Morena, Madhya Pradesh, India

Biography
Her great-grandfather Nathuram "Shankar" Sharma was poet of Hindi literature, and her grandfather Hari Shankar Sharma and father Kripa Shankar Sharma were also well known Hindi poets. She wrote about Indian ladies.

References

People from Morena
People from Aligarh
Hindi-language poets
Year of birth missing
Year of death missing